Seychelles, officially the Republic of Seychelles (Creole: La Repiblik Sesel), is an archipelagic state consisting of 115 islands in the Indian Ocean. Nearby island countries and territories include the Comoros, Madagascar, Mauritius, and the French overseas departments of Mayotte and Réunion to the south; and Maldives and the Chagos Archipelago (administered by the United Kingdom as the British Indian Ocean Territory) to the east. It is the least populated sovereign African country, with an estimated 2020 population of 98,462.

Seychelles was uninhabited prior to being encountered by Europeans in the 16th century. It faced competing French and British interests until coming under full British control in the late 18th century. Since proclaiming independence from the United Kingdom in 1976, it has developed from a largely agricultural society to a market-based diversified economy, characterized by rapidly rising service, public sector, and tourism activities. From 1976 to 2015, nominal GDP grew nearly 700%, and purchasing power parity nearly 1600%. Since the late 2010s, the government has taken steps to encourage foreign investment.

As of the early 21st century, Seychelles has the highest nominal per capita GDP of any African nation. It has the second-highest Human Development Index of any African country after Mauritius. It is the only African country classified as a high-income economy by the World Bank. 

Seychellois culture and society is an eclectic mix of French, British, and African influences, with more recent infusions of Chinese and Indian elements. The country is a member of the United Nations, the African Union, the Southern African Development Community, and the Commonwealth of Nations.

History 

Seychelles was uninhabited until the 18th century when Europeans arrived with enslaved Africans. It remained a British colony from 1814 until its independence in 1976. Seychelles have never been inhabited by indigenous people, but its islanders maintain their own Creole heritage.

Early history
Seychelles was uninhabited throughout most of recorded history. Tombs on the island, visible until 1910, are the basis for the scholarly belief that Austronesian seafarers and later Maldivian and Arab traders were the first to visit the archipelago.  Vasco da Gama and his 4th Portuguese India Armada discovered the Seychelles on 15 March 1503; the first sighting was made by Thomé Lopes aboard Rui Mendes de Brito.  Da Gama's ships passed close to an elevated island, probably Silhouette Island, and the following day Desroches Island. They mapped a group of seven islands and named them The Seven Sisters. The earliest recorded landing was in January 1609, by the crew of the Ascension under Captain Alexander Sharpeigh during the fourth voyage of the British East India Company.

A transit point for trade between Africa and Asia, it was said that the islands were occasionally used by pirates until the French began to take control in 1756 when a Stone of Possession was laid on Mahé by Captain Nicholas Morphey. The islands were named after Jean Moreau de Séchelles, Louis XV's Minister of Finance.

The British frigate Orpheus commanded by Captain Henry Newcome arrived at Mahé on 16 May 1794, during the War of the First Coalition. Terms of capitulation were drawn up and on the next day, Seychelles was surrendered to Britain. Jean Baptiste Quéau de Quincy, the French administrator of Seychelles during the years of war with the United Kingdom, declined to resist when armed enemy warships arrived. Instead, he successfully negotiated the status of capitulation to Britain which gave the settlers a privileged position of neutrality.

Britain eventually assumed full control upon the surrender of Mauritius in 1810, formalised in 1814 at the Treaty of Paris. Seychelles became a crown colony separate from Mauritius in 1903. Elections were held in 1966 and 1970.

Independence 
In 1976, Seychelles was granted independence from the United Kingdom and became a republic. It has been a member of the Commonwealth ever since. In the 1970s Seychelles was "the place to be seen, a playground for film stars and the international jet set". In 1977, a coup d'état by France Albert René ousted the first president of the republic, James Mancham. René discouraged over-dependence on tourism and declared that he wanted "to keep the Seychelles for the Seychellois".

The 1979 constitution declared a socialist one-party state, which lasted until 1991.

In the 1980s there were a series of coup attempts against President René, some of which were supported by South Africa. In 1981, Mike Hoare led a team of 43 South African mercenaries masquerading as holidaying rugby players in the 1981 Seychelles coup d'état attempt. There was a gun battle at the airport, and most of the mercenaries later escaped in a hijacked Air India plane. The leader of this hijacking was German mercenary D. Clodo, a former member of the Rhodesian SAS. Clodo later stood trial in South Africa (where he was acquitted) as well as in his home country Germany for air piracy.

In 1986, an attempted coup led by the Seychelles Minister of Defence, Ogilvy Berlouis, caused President René to request assistance from India. In Operation Flowers are Blooming, the Indian naval vessel Vindhyagiri arrived in Port Victoria to help avert the coup.

The first draft of a new constitution failed to receive the requisite 60% of voters in 1992, but an amended version was approved in 1993.

In January 2013, Seychelles declared a state of emergency when the tropical cyclone Felleng caused torrential rain, and flooding and landslides destroyed hundreds of houses.

Following the coup in 1977, the president always represented the same political party until the October 2020 Seychellois general election, which was historic in that the opposition party won. Wavel Ramkalawan was the first president who did not represent United Seychelles (the current name of the former Seychelles People's Progressive Front).

Politics

The Seychelles president, who is head of state and head of government, is elected by popular vote for a five-year term of office. The cabinet is presided over and appointed by the president, subject to the approval of a majority of the legislature. The current president is Wavel Ramkalawan, as of 2022.

The unicameral Seychellois parliament, the National Assembly or Assemblée Nationale, consists of 35 members, 26 of whom are elected directly by popular vote, while the remaining nine seats are appointed proportionally according to the percentage of votes received by each party. All members serve five-year terms.

The Supreme Court of Seychelles, created in 1903, is the highest trial court in Seychelles and the first court of appeal from all the lower courts and tribunals. The highest court of law in Seychelles is the Seychelles Court of Appeal, which is the court of final appeal in the country.

Political culture 

Seychelles' long-term president France Albert René came to power after his supporters overthrew the first president James Mancham on 5 June 1977 in a coup d'état and installed him as president. René was at that time the prime minister. René ruled as a strongman under a socialist one-party system until 1993, when he was forced to introduce a multi-party system. He stepped down in 2004 in favour of his vice-president, James Michel, who was re-elected in 2006, 2011 and again in 2015. On 28 September 2016, the Office of the President announced that Michel would step down effective 16 October, and that Vice President Danny Faure would complete the rest of Michel's term.

On 26 October 2020, Wavel Ramkalawan, a 59-year-old Anglican priest was elected the fifth President of the Republic of Seychelles. Ramkalawan was an opposition MP from 1993 to 2011, and from 2016 to 2020. He served as the Leader of the Opposition from 1998 to 2011 and from 2016 to 2020. Ramkalawan defeated incumbent Danny Faure by 54.9% to 43.5%. This marked the first time the opposition had won a presidential election.

The primary political parties are the former ruling socialist People's Party (PP), known until 2009 as the Seychelles People's Progressive Front (SPPF) now called United Seychelles (US), and the socially liberal Seychelles National Party (SNP).

The election of the National Assembly was held on 22–24 October 2020. The Seychelles National Party, the Seychelles Party for Social Justice and Democracy and the Seychelles United Party formed a coalition, Linyon Demokratik Seselwa (LDS). LDS won 25 seats and US got 10 seats of the 35 seats of the National Assembly.

Foreign relations 

Seychelles is a member of the United Nations, the African Union, the Indian Ocean Commission, La Francophonie, the Southern African Development Community and the Commonwealth of Nations.

From 1979 to 1981, the United States and South Africa were involved in the failed 1981 coup attempt. Under the Obama administration, the US began running drone operations out of Seychelles. In the Spring of 2013, members of the Special-Purpose Marine Air-Ground Task Force Africa mentored troops in Seychelles, along with a variety of other African nations.

Military 

The Military of Seychelles is the Seychelles People's Defence Force which consists of a number of distinct branches: an Infantry Unit and Coast Guard, Air Force and a Presidential Protection Unit. India has played and continues to play a key role in developing the military of Seychelles. After handing over two SDB Mk5 patrol vessels built by GRSE, the INS Tarasa and INS Tarmugli, to the Seychelles Coast Guard, which were subsequently renamed PS Constant and PS Topaz, India also gifted a Dornier 228 aircraft built by Hindustan Aeronautics Limited. India also signed a pact to develop Assumption Island, one of the 115 islands that make up the country. The island is being leased for the development of strategic assets by India. In 2018, Seychelles signed the UN treaty on the Prohibition of Nuclear Weapons.

Incarceration 

In 2014, Seychelles had the highest incarceration rate in the world of 799 prisoners per 100,000 population, exceeding the United States' rate by 15%. However, the country's actual population is less than 100,000; as of September 2014, Seychelles had 735 actual prisoners, 6% of whom were female, incarcerated in three prisons.

The incarceration rate in Seychelles has dropped significantly. It is not any more among the Top 10 Countries with the highest rate of incarceration. In 2022, the incarceration rate was 287 per 100,000 population, being just the 31st highest in the world.

Modern piracy 
Seychelles is a key participant in the fight against Indian Ocean piracy primarily committed by Somali pirates. Former president James Michel said that piracy costs between $7 million – $12 million a year to the international community: "The pirates cost 4% of the Seychelles GDP, including direct and indirect costs for the loss of boats, fishing, and tourism, and the indirect investment for the maritime security." These are factors affecting local fishing – one of the country's main national resources – which had a 46% loss in 2008–2009. International contributions of patrol boats, planes or drones have been provided to help Seychelles combat sea piracy.

Administrative divisions 

Seychelles is divided into twenty-six administrative regions comprising all of the inner islands. Eight of the districts make up the capital of Seychelles and are referred to as Greater Victoria. Another 14 districts are considered the rural part of the main island of Mahé with two districts on Praslin and one on La Digue which also includes respective satellite islands. The rest of the Outer Islands are the last district recently created by the tourism ministry.

Greater Victoria
Bel Air
La Rivière Anglaise (English River)
Les Mamelles
Mont Buxton
Mont Fleuri
Plaisance
Roche Caiman
Saint Louis

Rural Mahé
Anse aux Pins
Anse Boileau
Anse Etoile
Au Cap
Anse Royale
Baie Lazare
Beau Vallon
Bel Ombre
Cascade
Glacis
Grand'Anse Mahé
Pointe La Rue
Port Glaud
Takamaka

Praslin
Baie Sainte Anne (Anse Volbert)
Grand'Anse Praslin (Grande Anse)

La Digue and remaining Inner Islands
La Digue (Anse Réunion)

Geography 

The Constitution of Seychelles lists 155 named islands, and a further 7 reclaimed islands have been created subsequent to the publication of the Constitution. The majority of the islands are uninhabited, with many dedicated as nature reserves.

A group of 44 islands (42 granitic and 2 corallines) occupy the shallow waters of the Seychelles Bank and are collectively referred to as the inner islands.

The islands have been divided into groups. There are 42 granitic islands known as the Granitic Seychelles. These are in descending order of size: Mahé, Praslin, Silhouette, La Digue, Curieuse, Félicité, Frégate, Ste. Anne, North, Cerf, Marianne, Grand Sœur, Thérèse, Aride, Conception, Petite Sœur, Cousin, Cousine, Long, Récif, Round (Praslin), Anonyme, Mamelles, Moyenne, Ile aux Vaches Marines, L'Islette, Beacon (Ile Sèche), Cachée, Cocos, Round (Mahé), L'Ilot Frégate, Booby, Chauve Souris (Mahé), Chauve Souris (Praslin), Ile La Fouche, Hodoul, L'Ilot, Rat, Souris, St. Pierre (Praslin), Zavé, Harrison Rocks (Grand Rocher).

There are two coral sand cays north of the granitics on the edge of the Seychelles Bank: Denis and Bird. There are two coral islands south of the Granitic: Coëtivy and Platte.

There are 29 coral islands in the Amirantes group, west of the granitic: Desroches, Poivre Atoll (comprising three islands—Poivre, Florentin and South Island), Alphonse, D'Arros, St. Joseph Atoll (comprising 14 islands—St. Joseph, Île aux Fouquets, Resource, Petit Carcassaye, Grand Carcassaye, Benjamin, Bancs Ferrari, Chiens, Pélicans, Vars, Île Paul, Banc de Sable, Banc aux Cocos and Île aux Poules), Marie Louise, Desnœufs, African Banks (comprising two islands—African Banks and South Island), Rémire, St. François, Boudeuse, Étoile, Bijoutier.

There are 13 coral islands in the Farquhar Group, south-southwest of the Amirantes: Farquhar Atoll (comprising 10 islands—Bancs de Sable, Déposés, Île aux Goëlettes, Lapins, Île du Milieu, North Manaha, South Manaha, Middle Manaha, North Island and South Island), Providence Atoll (comprising two islands—Providence and Bancs Providence) and St Pierre.

There are 67 raised coral islands in the Aldabra Group, west of the Farquhar Group: Aldabra Atoll (comprising 46 islands—Grande Terre, Picard, Polymnie, Malabar, Île Michel, Île Esprit, Île aux Moustiques, Ilot Parc, Ilot Émile, Ilot Yangue, Ilot Magnan, Île Lanier, Champignon des Os, Euphrate, Grand Mentor, Grand Ilot, Gros Ilot Gionnet, Gros Ilot Sésame, Héron Rock, Hide Island, Île aux Aigrettes, Île aux Cèdres, Îles Chalands, Île Fangame, Île Héron, Île Michel, Île Squacco, Île Sylvestre, Île Verte, Ilot Déder, Ilot du Sud, Ilot du Milieu, Ilot du Nord, Ilot Dubois, Ilot Macoa, Ilot Marquoix, Ilots Niçois, Ilot Salade, Middle Row Island, Noddy Rock, North Row Island, Petit Mentor, Petit Mentor Endans, Petits Ilots, Pink Rock and Table Ronde), Assumption Island, Astove and Cosmoledo Atoll (comprising 19 islands—Menai, Île du Nord (West North), Île Nord-Est (East North), Île du Trou, Goélettes, Grand Polyte, Petit Polyte, Grand Île (Wizard), Pagode, Île du Sud-Ouest (South), Île aux Moustiques, Île Baleine, Île aux Chauve-Souris, Île aux Macaques, Île aux Rats, Île du Nord-Ouest, Île Observation, Île Sud-Est and Ilot la Croix).

In addition to these 155 islands, as per the Constitution of Seychelles, there are 7 reclaimed islands: Ile Perseverance, Ile Aurore, Romainville, Eden Island, Eve, Ile du Port and Ile Soleil.

South Island, African Banks has been eroded by the sea. At St Joseph Atoll, Banc de Sable and Pelican Island have also eroded, while Grand Carcassaye and Petit Carcassaye have merged to form one island. There are also several unnamed islands at Aldabra, St Joseph Atoll and Cosmoledo. Pti Astove, though named, failed to make it into the Constitution for unknown reasons. Bancs Providence is not a single island, but a dynamic group of islands, comprising four large and about six very small islets in 2016.

Climate 
The climate is equable although quite humid, as the islands are small, and is classified by the Köppen-Geiger system as a tropical rain forest (Af). The temperature varies little throughout the year. Precipitation levels are somewhat less on the other islands.

The southeast trade winds blow regularly from May to November, and this is the most pleasant time of the year. The hot months are from December to April, with higher humidity (80%). March and April are the hottest months, but the temperature seldom exceeds . Most of the islands lie outside the cyclone belt, so high winds are rare.

Wildlife 

Seychelles is among the world's leading countries to protect lands for threatened species, allocating 42% of its territory for conservation. Like many fragile island ecosystems, Seychelles saw the loss of biodiversity when humans first settled in the area, including the disappearance of most of the giant tortoises from the granitic islands, the felling of coastal and mid-level forests, and the extinction of species such as the chestnut flanked white eye, the Seychelles parakeet, and the saltwater crocodile. However, extinctions were far fewer than on islands such as Mauritius or Hawaii, partly due to a shorter period of colonizer occupation. Seychelles today is known for success stories in protecting its flora and fauna. The rare Seychelles black parrot, the national bird of the country, is now protected.

The freshwater crab genus Seychellum is endemic to the granitic Seychelles, and a further 26 species of crabs and five species of hermit crabs live on the islands. From the year 1500 until the mid-1800s (approximately), the then-previously unknown Aldabra giant tortoise was killed for food by pirates and sailors, driving their numbers to near-extinction levels. Today, a healthy yet fragile population of 150,000 tortoises live solely on the atoll of Aldabra, declared a UNESCO World Heritage Site. Additionally, these ancient reptiles can further be found in numerous zoos, botanical gardens, and private collections internationally.  Their protection from poaching and smuggling is overseen by CITES, whilst captive breeding has greatly reduced the negative impact on the remaining wild populations. The granitic islands of Seychelles supports three extant species of Seychelles giant tortoise. 

Seychelles hosts some of the largest seabird colonies in the world, notably on the outer islands of Aldabra and Cosmoledo. In granitic Seychelles the largest colonies are on Aride Island including the world's largest numbers of two species. The sooty tern also breeds on the islands. Other common birds include cattle egret (Bubulcus ibis) and the fairy tern (Gygis alba). More than 1,000 species of fish have been recorded.

The granitic islands of Seychelles are home to about 75 endemic plant species, with a further 25 or so species in the Aldabra group. Particularly well known is the coco de mer, a species of palm that grows only on the islands of Praslin and neighbouring Curieuse. Sometimes nicknamed the "love nut" (the shape of its "double" coconut resembles buttocks), the coco-de-mer produces the world's heaviest seed. The jellyfish tree is to be found in only a few locations on Mahé. This strange and ancient plant, in a genus of its own, Medusagyne seems to reproduce only in cultivation and not in the wild. Other unique plant species include Wright's gardenia (Rothmannia annae), found only on Aride Island’s Special Reserve. There are several unique species of orchid on the islands.

Seychelles is home to two terrestrial ecoregions: Granitic Seychelles forests and Aldabra Island xeric scrub. The country had a 2019 Forest Landscape Integrity Index mean score of 10/10, ranking it first globally out of 172 countries.

Environmental issues 
Since the use of spearguns and dynamite for fishing was banned through efforts of local conservationists in the 1960s, the wildlife is unafraid of snorkelers and divers. Coral bleaching in 1998 has damaged most reefs, but some reefs show healthy recovery (such as Silhouette Island).

Despite huge disparities across nations, Seychelles claims to have achieved nearly all of its Millennium Development Goals. 17 MDGS and 169 targets have been achieved.  Environmental protection is becoming a cultural value.

Their government's Seychelles Climate Guide describes the nation's climate as rainy, with a dry season with an ocean economy in the ocean regions.  The Southeast Trades is on the decline but still fairly strong. Reportedly, weather patterns there are becoming less predictable.

Demographics 

When the British gained control of the islands during the Napoleonic Wars, they allowed the French upper class to retain their land. Both the French and British settlers used enslaved Africans, and although the British prohibited slavery in 1835, African workers continued to come. Thus the Gran blan ("big whites") of French origin dominated economic and political life. The British administration employed Indians on indentured servitude to the same degree as in Mauritius resulting in a small Indian population. The Indians, like a similar minority of Chinese, were confined to a merchant class.

Today, Seychelles is described as a fusion of peoples and cultures. Numerous Seychellois are considered multiracial: blending from African, Asian and European descent to create a modern creole culture. Evidence of this harmonious blend is also revealed in Seychellois food, incorporating various aspects of French, Chinese, Indian and African cuisine.

As the islands of the Seychelles had no indigenous population, the current Seychellois descend from people who immigrated, of which the largest ethnic groups were those of African, French, Indian and Chinese origin. The median age of the Seychellois is 34 years.

Languages
French and English are official languages along with Seychellois Creole, which is a French-based creole language. Seychellois Creole is the most widely spoken native language and de facto the national language of the country. Seychellois Creole is often spoken with English words and phrases mixed in. About 91% of the population are native speakers of Seychelles Creole, 5.1% of English and 0.7% of French. Most business and official meetings are conducted in English and nearly all official websites are in English. National Assembly business is conducted in Creole, but laws are passed and published in English.

Religion 

According to the 2010 census, most Seychellois are Christians: 76.2% were Roman Catholic, pastorally served by the exempt Diocese of Port Victoria (directly subject to the Holy See); 10.6% were Protestant, (Anglican 6.1%, Pentecostal Assembly 1.5%, Seventh-Day Adventist 1.2%, other Protestant 1.6%).

Hinduism is the second largest religion, with more than 2.4% of the population. Hinduism is followed mainly by the Indo-Seychellois community.

Islam is followed by another 1.6% of the population.  Other faiths accounted for 1.1% of the population, while a further 5.9% were non-religious or did not specify a religion.

Economy 

During the plantation era, cinnamon, vanilla and copra were the chief exports. In 1965, during a three-month visit to the islands, futurist Donald Prell prepared for the then-crown colony's Governor General an economic report containing a scenario for the future of the economy.  Quoting from his report, in the 1960s, about 33% of the working population worked at plantations, and 20% worked in the public or government sector. The Indian Ocean Tracking Station on Mahé used by the Air Force Satellite Control Network was closed in August 1996 after the Seychelles government attempted to raise the rent to more than $10,000,000 per year.

Since independence in 1976, per capita output has expanded to roughly seven times the old near-subsistence level. Growth has been led by the tourist sector, which employs about 30% of the labour force, compared to agriculture which today employs about 3% of the labour force. Despite the growth of tourism, farming and fishing continue to employ some people, as do industries that process coconuts and vanilla.

, the main export products are processed fish (60%) and non-fillet frozen fish (22%).

The prime agricultural products currently produced in Seychelles include sweet potatoes, vanilla, coconuts and cinnamon. These products provide much of the economic support of the locals. Frozen and canned fish, copra, cinnamon and vanilla are the main export commodities.

The Seychelles government has prioritised a curbing of the budget deficit, including the containment of social welfare costs and further privatisation of public enterprises. The government has a pervasive presence in economic activity, with public enterprises active in petroleum product distribution, banking, imports of basic products, telecommunications and a wide range of other businesses. According to the 2013 Index of Economic Freedom, which measures the degree of limited government, market openness, regulatory efficiency, rule of law, and other factors, economic freedom has been increasing each year since 2010. 

The national currency of Seychelles is the Seychellois rupee. Initially tied to a basket of international currencies, it was unpegged and allowed to be devalued and float freely in 2008 on the presumed hopes of attracting further foreign investment in the Seychelles economy.

Seychelles has emerged as the least corrupt country in Africa in the latest Corruption Perception Index report released by Transparency International in January 2020.

Tourism 

In 1971, with the opening of Seychelles International Airport, tourism became a significant industry, essentially dividing the economy into plantations and tourism. The tourism sector paid better, and the plantation economy could expand only so far. The plantation sector of the economy declined in prominence, and tourism became the primary industry of Seychelles. Consequently, there was a sustained spate of hotel construction throughout almost the entire 1970s which included the opening of Coral Strand Smart Choice, Vista Do Mar and Bougainville Hotel in 1972.

In recent years the government has encouraged foreign investment to upgrade hotels and other services. These incentives have given rise to an enormous amount of investment in real estate projects and new resort properties, such as project TIME, distributed by the World Bank, along with its predecessor project MAGIC. Despite its growth, the vulnerability of the tourist sector was illustrated by the sharp drop in 1991–1992 due largely to the Gulf War.

Since then the government has moved to reduce the dependence on tourism by promoting the development of farming, fishing, small-scale manufacturing and most recently the offshore financial sector, through the establishment of the Financial Services Authority and the enactment of several pieces of legislation (such as the International Corporate Service Providers Act, the International Business Companies Act, the Securities Act, the Mutual Funds and Hedge Fund Act, amongst others). In March 2015, Seychelles allocated Assumption Island to be developed by India.

Owing to the effects of COVID-19, Seychelles shut down its borders to international tourism in the year 2020. The nation is slated to reopen its borders to international tourists from 25 March 2021. As the national vaccination program progressed well, the nation's Ministry of Foreign Affairs and Tourism has taken the decision to allow foreign tourists while keeping public health measures in place, such as wearing of face masks, social distancing, regular sanitisation, and washing of hands.

Energy 

Although multinational oil companies have explored the waters around the islands, no oil or gas has been found. In 2005, a deal was signed with US firm Petroquest, giving it exploration rights to about 30,000 km2 around Constant, Topaz, Farquhar and Coëtivy islands until 2014.

In recent years oil has been imported from Kuwait and also from Bahrain. Seychelles imports three times more oil than is needed for internal uses because it re-exports the surplus oil in the form of bunker for ships and aircraft calling at Mahé. There are no refining capacities on the islands. Oil and gas imports, distribution and re-export are the responsibility of Seychelles Petroleum (Sepec), while oil exploration is the responsibility of the Seychelles National Oil Company (SNOC).

Culture

Art 

A National Art Gallery was inaugurated in 1994 on the occasion of the official opening of the National Cultural Centre, which houses the National Library and National Archives with other offices of the Ministry of Culture.

At its inauguration, the Minister of Culture decreed that the exhibition of works of Seychellois artists, painters and sculptors was a testimony to the development of art in Seychelles as a creative form of expression, and provided a view of the state of the country's contemporary art.

Painters have traditionally been inspired by Seychelles’ natural features to produce a wide range of works in media ranging from watercolours to oils, acrylics, collages, metals, aluminium, wood, fabrics, gouache, varnishes, recycled materials, pastels, charcoal, embossing, etching, and giclee prints. Local sculptors produce fine works in wood, stone, bronze and cartonnage.

Music 

Music and dance have always played prominent roles in Seychelles culture and local festivities. Rooted in African, Malagasy and European cultures, music characteristically features drums such as the tambour and tam-tam, and simple string instruments. The violin and guitar are relatively recent foreign imports which play a prominent role in contemporary music.

Among popular dances are the Sega, with hip-swaying and shuffling of the feet, and the Moutya, a dance dating back to the days of slavery, when it was often used to express strong emotions and discontent.

The music of Seychelles is diverse, a reflection of the fusion of cultures through its history. The folk music of the islands incorporates multiple influences in a syncretic fashion. It includes African rhythms, aesthetic and instrumentation, such as the zez and the bom (known in Brazil as berimbau); European contredanse, polka and mazurka; French folk and pop; sega from Mauritius and Réunion; taarab, soukous and other pan-African genres; and Polynesian, Indian and Arcadian music.

Contombley is a popular form of percussion music, as is Moutya, a fusion of native folk rhythms with Kenyan benga. Kontredans, based on European contra dance, is also popular, especially in district and school competitions during the annual Festival Kreol (International Creole Festival). Moutya playing and dancing often occur at beach bazaars. Music is sung in the Seychellois Creole of the French language, and in French and English.

In 2021, the Moutya, a slave trade-era dance, was added to the UNESCO Intangible Cultural Heritage List as a symbol of psychological comfort in its role of resistance against hardship, poverty, servitude and social injustice.

Cuisine 

Staple foods of Sechelles include fish, seafood and shellfish dishes, often accompanied with rice. Fish dishes are cooked several ways, such as steamed, grilled, wrapped in banana leaves, baked, salted and smoked. Curry dishes with rice are also a significant part of the country's cuisine.

Other staples include coconut, breadfruit, mangoes and kordonnyen fish. Dishes are often garnished with fresh flowers.

 Chicken dishes, such as chicken curry and coconut milk.
 Coconut curry
Dal (lentils)
 Fish curry
Saffron rice
 Fresh tropical fruits
Ladob, eaten either as a savoury dish or as a dessert. The dessert version usually consists of ripe plantain and sweet potatoes (but may also include cassava, breadfruit or even corossol), boiled with coconut milk, sugar, nutmeg and vanilla in the form of a pod until the fruit is soft and the sauce is creamy. The savoury dish usually includes salted fish, cooked in a similar fashion to the dessert version, with plantain, cassava and breadfruit, but with salt used in place of sugar (and omitting vanilla).
Shark chutney typically consists of boiled skinned shark, finely mashed and cooked with squeezed bilimbi juice and lime. It is mixed with onion and spices, with the onion fried and cooked in oil.
 Vegetables

Media 

The main daily newspaper is the Seychelles Nation, dedicated to local government views and current topics. Other political parties operate papers such as Regar. Foreign newspapers and magazines are readily available at most bookshops and newsagents. The papers are published mostly in Seychellois Creole, French and English.

The main television and radio network, operated by the Seychelles Broadcasting Corporation, offers locally produced news and discussion programmes in the Seychellois Creole language, between 3 pm and 11:30 pm on weekdays and longer hours on weekends. There are also imported English- and French-language television programmes on Seychellois terrestrial television, and international satellite television has grown rapidly in recent years.

Sports 
Seychelles' most popular sport is basketball, which has significantly grown in popularity in the last decade. The country's national team qualified for the 2015 African Games, where it competed against some of the continent's largest countries, such as Egypt. In 2015, Seychelles hosted the African Beach Soccer Championship. Ten years later, Seychelles will host the 2025 FIFA Beach Soccer World Cup making it the first ever FIFA Beach Soccer World Cup to be ever held in Africa.

Women 

Seychellois society is essentially matrilineal. Mothers tend to be dominant in the household, controlling most expenditures and looking after children's interests. Unwed mothers are the societal norm, and the law requires fathers to support their children. Men are important for their earning ability, but their domestic role is relatively peripheral.

LGBT rights 

Same-sex sexual activity has been legal since 2016. The bill decriminalizing homosexuality was approved in a 14–0 vote. The employment discrimination on the basis of sexual orientation is banned in the Seychelles, making it one of the few African countries to have such protections for LGBT people.

Education 

Seychelles has the highest literacy rate of any country in sub-Saharan Africa. According to The World Factbook of the Central Intelligence Agency, as of 2018, 95.9% of the population aged 15 and over can read and write in the Seychelles.

Until the mid-19th century, little formal education was available in Seychelles. The Catholic and Anglican churches opened mission schools in 1851. The Catholic mission later operated boys' and girls' secondary schools with religious brothers and nuns from abroad even after the government became responsible for them in 1944.

A teacher training college opened in 1959, when the supply of locally trained teachers began to grow, and in short time many new schools were established. Since 1981 a system of free education has been in effect, requiring attendance by all children in grades one to nine, beginning at age five. Ninety percent of all children attend nursery school at age four.

The literacy rate for school-age children rose to more than 90% by the late 1980s. Many older Seychellois had not been taught to read or write in their childhood; adult education classes helped raise adult literacy from 60% to a claimed 100% in 2014.

There are a total of 68 schools in Seychelles. The public school system consists of 23 crèches, 25 primary schools and 13 secondary schools. They are located on Mahé, Praslin, La Digue and Silhouette. Additionally, there are three private schools: École Française, International School and the independent school. All the private schools are on Mahé, and the International School has a branch on Praslin. There are seven post-secondary (non-tertiary) schools: the Seychelles Polytechnic, School of Advanced Level Studies, Seychelles Tourism Academy, University of Seychelles Education, Seychelles Institute of Technology, Maritime Training Center, Seychelles Agricultural and Horticultural Training Center and the National Institute for Health and Social Studies.

The administration launched plans to open a university in an attempt to slow down the brain drain that has occurred. University of Seychelles, initiated in conjunction with the University of London, opened on 17 September 2009 in three locations, and offers qualifications from the University of London.

Notable people
 

Andy Mougal, football player
Kevin Betsy, football coach and former professional footballer

See also 

 Outline of Seychelles
 Index of Seychelles-related articles
 Illegal drug trade in Seychelles (highest heroin use per capita in the world)

References

External links 

Government
 SeyGov, main government portal
 State House, Office of the President of the Republic of Seychelles
 Central Bank of Seychelles, on-shore banking and insurance regulator
 Seychelles Investment Bureau, government agency promoting investment in Seychelles
 National Bureau of Statistics, government agency responsible for collecting, compiling, analysing and publishing statistical information

Religion
 GigaCatholic

General
 Seychelles. The World Factbook. Central Intelligence Agency.
 Seychelles from UCB Libraries GovPubs
 
 Seychelles from BBC News
 
 Island Conservation Society, a non-profit nature conservation and educational non-governmental organisation
 Nature Seychelles, a scientific/environmental non-governmental nature protection association
 The Seychelles Nation, the largest circulation local daily newspaper
 Seychelles Bird Records Committee
 Seychelles.travel, Government tourism portal
 Tourism Page
 Air Seychelles, Seychelles national airline
 ADST interview with U.S. Ambassador to Seychelles David Fischer

 
1976 establishments in Africa
Republics in the Commonwealth of Nations
Countries in Africa
East African countries
Island countries
English-speaking countries and territories
Former colonies in Africa
Former French colonies
French-speaking countries and territories
French colonisation in Africa
Island countries of the Indian Ocean
Member states of the African Union
Member states of the Commonwealth of Nations
Member states of the Organisation internationale de la Francophonie
Member states of the United Nations
Small Island Developing States
Somali Sea
States and territories established in 1976